Village Green was a cricket venue in Christchurch. It is a back-up first-class cricket ground in New Zealand.  It was the home of the District's first class cricket team, the State Canterbury Wizards.

Village Green is part of the main stadium of Queen Elizabeth II Park, and was often used for inter-provincial competition when the AMI Stadium was unavailable for use.

The stadium had been damaged after the 2010 Canterbury earthquake but was able to reopen; it was severely damaged beyond repair after the February 2011 Christchurch earthquake which has damaged the running track and recreation complex. The stadium and pool complex was demolished in 2012 after engineering reports found it beyond repair.

References

External links
 Wikimapia
 espncricinfo
 cricketarchive
 Canterbury Wizards Official Website

1998 establishments in New Zealand
2012 disestablishments in New Zealand
Sports venues in Christchurch
Cricket grounds in New Zealand